WAKO (910 AM) is a radio station airing a classic country format. Licensed to Lawrenceville, Illinois, United States, the station is currently owned by David Crooks, through licensee DLC Media.

On April 2, 2017, WAKO split off its simulcast of adult contemporary sister station WAKO-FM and launched as "The Legend", a classic country radio station.

References

External links

AKO (AM)
Classic country radio stations in the United States